The 2019–20 Derde Divisie season was the fourth edition of the Dutch fourth tier, formerly called Topklasse, since the restructuring of the league system in the summer of 2016.

Effects of the 2020 coronavirus pandemic 
On 12 March 2020, all football leagues were suspended until 31 March as the Dutch government forbade events due to the COVID-19 pandemic in the Netherlands. On 15 March this period was extended until 6 April. Due to the decision of the Dutch government to forbid all gatherings and events until 1 June 2020, this period was even further extended.

Eventually, on 31 March 2020, the KNVB decided not to resume competitions at amateur level. They also decided, for those competitions involved, there would be no final standings, and therefore no champions, no promotions and no relegations. All teams will start next season at the same level as they did this season.

Later on 12 June, the KNVB officially announced that the Derde Divisie would again consist of 36 teams from next season. This was one wish of CVTD, the interest group of football clubs from the Tweede and Derde Divisies. After the loss of the two reserve teams, the withdrawal of FC Lienden and the voluntary relegation of ONS Sneek, the two divisions of the third tier would have consisted of only 15 clubs each. To accommodate all group leaders in the Hoofdklasse, the KNVB decided to make each Derde Divisie group have 18 teams. The Hoofklasse group leaders, namely Sportlust '46, Staphorst, Unitas and Hollandia, therefore moved up to the Derde Divisie. The best runners-up of the Saturday and Sunday Hoofdklasse, ACV and JOS Watergraafsmeer, were also allowed to be promoted.

Saturday league

Teams 

>> As the competition was cancelled, below is the situation on 7 March 2020, the date the last matches were played. <<

Standings

Fixtures and results

Sunday league

Teams 

>> As the competition was cancelled, below is the situation on 8 March 2020, the date the last matches were played. <<

Standings

Fixtures and results

References 

Derde Divisie seasons
Derde Divisie
Netherlands
Derde Divisie